Cresent Leo Hardy (born June 23, 1957) is an American politician and businessman who served as the U.S. representative for  from 2015 to 2017. A member of the Republican Party, he previously served in the Nevada Assembly from 2010 to 2014.

Hardy unseated one-term Democratic incumbent Steven Horsford in 2014, then lost his own bid for reelection in the 2016 general election to Democratic challenger Ruben Kihuen. Kihuen then retired after one term due to sexual misconduct allegations, so Hardy ran for his old seat in 2018, losing to Horsford in a rematch. Hardy later ran unsuccessfully for Nevada's 1st congressional district in the 2022 election.

Early life and education
Hardy graduated from Virgin Valley High School and Dixie State College.

Business career

Since leaving college, Hardy has pursued a career in business. He is a partial owner of properties in Alaska and Utah as well as in and around Mesquite, Nevada. Prior to entering Congress, he was a partner in a construction company. He was also one of several owners of Mesquite's Falcon Ridge Golf Course, which he personally designed.

Hardy began his career in government by serving as the public works director in Mesquite, Nevada. He then became a member of the Virgin Valley Water District and a member of the Mesquite City Council. He was elected to the Nevada State Assembly in 2010.

U.S. House of Representatives

Elections
2014

Hardy defeated Horsford 48.5%-45.7%.

Hardy held "a number of community meetings" after being elected. He said "the two issues he heard about most often...were jobs and health care," and these would become his priorities in office.

2016

Hardy ran for re-election in 2016. Hardy faced two challengers in the Republican primary in June 2016, winning 77.44% of the vote. In the general election, he faced Democratic state senator Ruben Kihuen. Kihuen defeated Hardy with 48.5% of the vote. While Hardy carried six of the district's seven counties, he could not overcome a 24,000-vote deficit in Clark County. After initially supporting Donald Trump's presidential bid, Hardy said in October 2016 he would not vote for Trump.

2018

In January 2018, Hardy announced his candidacy for his old congressional seat after Republican Las Vegas City Councilman Stavros Anthony dropped out of the race. He won the June 2018 Republican primary. In August 2018, Speaker of the House Paul Ryan campaigned for Hardy in Las Vegas.

Hardy faced Democratic nominee and former U.S. Representative for the district, Steven Horsford in the general election. Horsford defeated Hardy, winning 52% of the vote to Hardy's 44%. Third-party candidates took the remaining 4% of the vote.

Committee assignments
Committee on Natural Resources
Subcommittee on Energy and Mineral Resources
Subcommittee on Federal Lands
Committee on Small Business
Subcommittee on Contracting and Workforce (Chair)
Subcommittee on Investigations, Oversight and Regulations
Committee on Transportation and Infrastructure
Subcommittee on Highways and Transit
Subcommittee on Railroads, Pipelines, and Hazardous Materials
Subcommittee on Water Resources and Environment

Political positions

Immigration 
Hardy voted against an amendment to defund President Barack Obama's DACA program.

Health care 
In 2016, Hardy and Terri Sewell (D-AL) introduced the Rural Health Enhancement and Long Term Health Act (HEALTH), intended to forestall the closure of rural hospitals.

Iran deal 
Hardy opposed President Obama's Iran deal.

Personal life
Hardy and his wife, Peri Jean Hardy, have four children and two grandchildren.

In August 2016, Hardy was hospitalized after a heart attack that occurred while he was preparing to undergo a colonoscopy. The next day he returned to his re-election campaign. Doctors discovered he had been living with a collapsed artery on his heart, and they inserted two stents to repair it. Hardy said "I actually feel better than I've felt in quite some time."

Electoral history

References

External links
 
 
 

|-

|-

|-

1957 births
21st-century American politicians
Candidates in the 2018 United States elections
Candidates in the 2022 United States House of Representatives elections
Utah Tech University alumni
Latter Day Saints from Nevada
Living people
Republican Party members of the Nevada Assembly
Nevada city council members
Politicians from Carson City, Nevada
People from Mesquite, Nevada
People from St. George, Utah
Republican Party members of the United States House of Representatives from Nevada